Hořenice is a municipality and village in Náchod District in the Hradec Králové Region of the Czech Republic. It has about 200 inhabitants.

History
The first written mention of Hořenice is from 1500.

References

Villages in Náchod District